Altınbaşak is a municipality (belde) in the Üzümlü District, Erzincan Province, Turkey. It had a population of 2,027 in 2021.

The municipality is divided into the neighborhoods of Büyükkadağan, Fırat, İstasyon, Küçük Kadağan, Pınarbaşı and Süleymanlı.

References 

Towns in Turkey
Populated places in Erzincan Province